is a Japanese professional cosplayer, voice actress, and singer from Nagoya.

Biography 
Enako started cosplaying in second year of middle school after she became interested in the animated series The Melancholy of Haruhi Suzumiya and saw other cosplayers portraying the main character in Akihabara.

On October 24, 2012, Enako and fellow cosplayers  and  made their major label debut as the idol group Panache! under the label Defstar Records. The group disbanded on April 26, 2013 and Enako entered a temporary hiatus in her idol activities.

On March 4, 2015, Enako announced the resumption of her cosplay activities on her newly opened Twitter account.

In 2016, Enako revealed on a television show that she made over 1 million yen a month, and made 10 million yen in two days at that year's Comiket event. The Straits Times later reported that Enako made 130,000 Singapore dollar in one day at Comiket 2018. She also made an appearance at Comiket 2019.

On December 16, 2020, Enako made her debut as a solo singer with the release of her first mini-album, Dress Re Code.

On April 11, 2021, Enako launched her YouTube channel.

On July 30, 2022, PP Enterprises, Enako's agency, formed the idol group PPE41, and Enako became a member.

Personal life 
On July 1, 2021, Enako announced that she is dating Kenki, a professional gamer.

Discography

Panache!

Album

Singles

Solo

Album

Singles

Filmography

Photo CDs

TV 
 Idol Ouen Variety Seiji Chihara no Bazu Doru with Rena Matsui (アイドル応援バラエティ 千原せいじのバズ☆ドルwith松井玲奈, Apr 25, 2016 -)

Internet delivery 
 ToukaigiTV no Ongaku Bangumi Geon! (闘会議TVの音楽番組げーおん!, December 15, 2015 -)
 BEMANI namahousou kari dai125kai VOLZZA 2 Kadou Cyokuzen Special (BEMANI生放送(仮)第125回!VOLZZA 2稼働直前スペシャル!!, Mar 23, 2016)

Video games

2015 
 Mobile Strike (モバイルストライク, Nov.7, running)

2016 
 Sangokushiranbu (三国志乱舞, Jan.22)
 REFLEC BEAT VOLZZA 2 (Mar.24) – Recorded Music「Precioue☆Star DJ TOTTO feat.Enako」
 Shinkukan Dolls (真空管ドールズ, The end of April) – Hime Takatsuki Voice acting

Anime 
 Armor Shop for Ladies & Gentlemen (2018–2021) – Maō
 Yu-Gi-Oh! Go Rush!! (2022) – Meegu-chan

References

External links 

 enako official site  (Sep.21.2018 –)
 Enako - PP Enter Prise inc.  (Apr.1.2021 –)

1994 births
Living people
21st-century Japanese actresses
21st-century Japanese singers
Cosplayers
Japanese women pop singers
Japanese female idols
Japanese YouTubers
Japanese voice actresses
People from Nagoya
21st-century Japanese women singers
Musicians from Aichi Prefecture